The Royal Australian Naval College (RANC), commonly known as HMAS Creswell, is the naval academy of the Royal Australian Navy (RAN). It consists of the RAN School of Survivability and Ship's Safety, Kalkara Flight, the Beecroft Weapons Range and an administrative support department. It is located between Jervis Bay Village and Greenpatch on the shores of Jervis Bay in the Jervis Bay Territory. Since 1915, the RANC has been the initial officer training establishment of the Royal Australian Navy.

The commanding officer of Creswell as of January 2019 is Captain Warren Bairstow, RAN.

History
On 7 November 1911 the Australian Parliament selected the site of Captain's Point in the Jervis Bay Territory on the south coast of New South Wales, near Nowra, for the Royal Australian Naval College. While the new college was built, RANC was temporarily located at Osborne House, Geelong. Osborne House had been considered as a permanent location for the College.

Construction of the main college buildings was completed in 1915. The senior staff bungalows were designed by John Smith Murdoch, later the Chief Architect of the Commonwealth of Australia and designer of the Provisional Parliament House in Canberra.

The first intake consisted of 13-year old boys, who stayed at the college for four years. The first graduation parade took place on 12 December 1916 before the Governor-General, Sir Ronald Munro-Ferguson. The graduates were 23 members of the 1913 Entry, known as the Pioneer class. On graduation they were promoted to Midshipmen and joined the Grand Fleet where they saw war service.

The RANC, then consisting of the first two entries of cadet midshipmen, moved to Jervis Bay on 10 February 1915. It was moved to Flinders Naval Depot in 1930 to reduce costs during the Great Depression. To reduce overcrowding at the depot, the college moved once again to Captain's Point in 1958. The establishment at Captain's Point was renamed HMAS Creswell in honour of Sir William Rooke Creswell, a former Lieutenant in the Royal Navy who was an important colonial naval officer, was instrumental to the formation of an independent Australian navy, and served as the First Naval Member of the Naval Board from 1911 to 1919.

The College today
Located at Creswell is the Royal Australian Naval College (RANC), Australia's authority for the basic and leadership training of officers for service in the Royal Australian Navy. The main course run by the College is the 22-week New Entry Officers' Course which provides initial entry training for most of the RAN's officers. The RANC also conducts the residential component of the Reserve Entry Officers' Course. Further training for officers such as the Junior Officers' Leadership Course and the Junior Officers' Management and Staff Course also take place at the RANC; and there is the one-week residential Undergraduate Entry Officers' Course that provides junior officers who are undertaking university studies, to have a fundamental understanding of the Navy.

New Entry Officers' Course 
The New Entry Officers' Course (NEOC) is undertaken by direct entry officers, graduate entry officers, and candidates who intend to proceed to the Australian Defence Force Academy (ADFA) to gain their degree. Generally, trainees who have no university education or a three-year degree enter the college as Midshipmen, whilst trainees with significant experience or more university education enter as Sub-Lieutenants, Lieutenants and Chaplains. Under the Naval Officer Year One (NOYO) scheme introduced in 2000, Midshipmen attending ADFA spend their first year on NEOC and, for Junior Warfare and Supply Officers, on initial phases of their respective application courses before progressing to the Academy.

After completing training at the College, officers proceed to other establishments for primary qualification training. Locations include HMAS Watson, for Junior Warfare Officers (formerly known as Seamen Officers), and Cerberus, for Electronics Engineer, Marine Engineer and Supply officers.

Subjects studied at NEOC include:

Military training, including drill, discipline, command, wearing of the uniform, parade and ceremony
Proficiency on the ADF's service firearm, the F88 Austeyr
Physical training and fitness
RAN History
Survival at sea
Sea combat survivability
Naval weapons and technology
Maritime studies including boatwork and basic seamanship
Leadership and command studies
RAN rank, organisational and operational structure

The course includes two periods of sea training:

One week sea familiarisation course, where the basics of seamanship taught in the classroom are applied in practice
Four week Sea Training Deployment, where the trainees become crew members of a Major Fleet Unit, and accompany the ship for whatever activities it is undertaking at the time

Notable RANC graduates
 

Rear Admiral Otto Becher 
Captain Joseph Burnett 
Vice Admiral Sir John Augustine Collins 
Captain Emile Frank Verlaine Dechaineux 
Rear Admiral Harold B. Farncomb 
Rear Admiral Galfry Gatacre 
Commodore Sir James Maxwell Ramsay 
Lieutenant Commander Robert William "Oscar" Rankin 
Captain Hector Waller

Other facilities

RAN School of Ship Survivability and Safety
Its facilities include two firefighting training units and a floodable mock-up of ships compartments, known as "Counter-Sink".

Beecroft Weapons Range
Beecroft Weapons Range, located on Beecroft Head, is a live fire range for conducting Naval Gunfire Support (NGS) exercises.

See also
List of Royal Australian Navy bases

References

External links
Official Royal Australian Naval College website
NEOC Joining Instructions
Six-part documentary about life at NEOC, produced by the RAN
Royal Australian Naval College - YouTube

Naval academies
Military installations established in 1915
Creswell
Creswell
1915 establishments in Australia
John Smith Murdoch buildings
Military installations in the Australian Capital Territory
Jervis Bay Territory